The Gulf of Genoa (Golfo di Genova) is the northernmost part of the Ligurian Sea. The largest city on its coast is Genoa, which has an important port.

References

Genoa
Gulfs of the Mediterranean